The Man in the Photograph (Čovjek s fotografije) is a Yugoslavian film directed by Vladimir Pogačić. It was released in 1963.

Plot
Žika Tasić, a clerk, is arrested because of his resemblance to Beli, a resistance member. Under torture, Žika confesses everything he was accused of, but Beli is apparently still active, and the police realize they have the wrong man. Šulc, the Gestapo chief, releases Žika as a decoy in order to capture Beli, while the resistance hope to use Žika to assassinate Šulc.

Sources
 Čovjek s fotografije at hrfilm.hr

External links
 

1963 films
Croatian-language films
Yugoslav war drama films
Films directed by Vladimir Pogačić
Jadran Film films
Yugoslav World War II films
Croatian black-and-white films